The Korean pavilion houses South Korea's national representation during the Venice Biennale arts festivals.

Background

Organization and building 

The Korean Pavilion, designed by Seok Chul Kim and Franco Mancuso, was built between 1994 and 1995.

South Korea has participated in the Venice Biennale since 1995.

Representation by year

Art 

 1995 — Yoon Hyong Keun, Kwak Hoon, Kim In Kyum, Jheon Soocheon (Commissioner: Il Lee)
 1997 — Hyungwoo Lee, Ik-joong Kang (Curator: Oh Kwang Soo)
 1999 — Lee Bul, Noh Sang-Kyoon (Curator: Misook Song)
 2001 — Michael Joo, Do-Ho Suh (Commissioner: Kyung-mee Park)
 2003 — Whang In Kie, Bahc Yiso, Chung Seoyoung (Commissioner: Kim Hong-Hee)
 2007 — Hyungkoo Lee (Commissioner: Soyeon Ahn)
 2009 — Haegue Yang (Commissioner: Eungie Joo)
 2011 — Lee Yong-baek (Commissioner: Yun Chea-gab)
 2013 — Kimsooja (Curator: Kim Seung-duk)
 2015 — Moon Kyungwon, Jeon Joonho (Curator: Sook-Kyung Lee)
 2017 — Cody Choi, Lee Wan (Curator: Lee Daehyung)
 2019 – Hwayeon Nam, Siren Eun Young Jung, Jane Jin Kaisen (Curator: Hyunjin Kim)

References

Bibliography

Further reading 

 https://www.dezeen.com/2014/06/06/korean-pavilion-mass-studies-north-south-venice-architecture-biennale-2014/
 https://news.artnet.com/art-world/cody-choi-lee-wan-korean-pavilion-venice-854561
 https://www.dezeen.com/2014/06/07/awarded-best-pavilion-at-venice-architecture-biennale/
 http://artasiapacific.com/News/CuratorAndArtistsAnnouncedFor2019VeniceBiennaleKoreanPavilion
 https://www.artforum.com/news/2019-venice-biennale-s-korean-pavilion-participants-announced-76639
 https://artreview.com/previews/2017_venice_28_korea_daehyung_lee/
 https://www.artsy.net/article/artsy-editorial-republic-of-korea-pavilion-at-the-56th-venice

External links 

 

National pavilions
South Korean art